Tachystola stenoptera is a moth of the family Oecophoridae. It is found in the  Australian Capital Territory, New South Wales, Queensland, South Australia, Tasmania, Victoria and Western Australia.

The larvae live in a flattened silk case between tied dead leaves. They feed on dead leaves of Eucalyptus bicostata, Eucalyptus populnea, Eucalyptus melliodora and other Eucalyptus species.

External links
Australian Faunal Directory

Oecophoridae